The 1982 Campeonato Brasileiro Série A, (officially the 1982 Taça de Ouro) was the 26th edition of the Campeonato Brasileiro Série A.

Overview
44 teams took part, with Flamengo winning the championship.

First phase

Group A

Group B

Group C

Group D

Group E

Group F

Group G

Group H

Repechage

Second phase

Group I

Group J

Group K

Group L

Group M

Group N

Group O

Group P

Round of 16

Quarterfinals

Semifinals

Finals

First leg

Second leg

Replay

Final standings

See also
 1982 Taça de Prata

References
 1982 Campeonato Brasileiro Série A at RSSSF

1982
1
Brazil
B